Archmagic is a 1993 role-playing game supplement published by Mayfair Games as part of their Role Aids line.

Contents
Archmagic is a boxed set containing three books, and is an expansion for wizards who have reached high level and still want to progress.

Reception
Loyd Blankenship reviewed Archmagic in Pyramid #3 (Sept./Oct., 1993), and stated that "While Archmagic is intended for use with AD&D, portions of it will be applicable to your GURPS (or any other) fantasy campaign. The advice on archmage motivations, strategy, etc., are particularly useful for anyone planning a high-powered magical NPC."

References

Fantasy role-playing game supplements
Role Aids
Role-playing game supplements introduced in 1993